T-Mobile Park is a retractable roof stadium in Seattle, Washington, United States. It is the home ballpark of Major League Baseball's Seattle Mariners and has a seating capacity of 47,929. It is in Seattle's SoDo neighborhood, near the western terminus of Interstate 90. It is owned and operated by the Washington State Major League Baseball Stadium Public Facilities District. The first game at the stadium was played on July 15, 1999.

During the 1990s, the suitability of the Mariners' original stadium—the Kingdome—as an MLB facility came under question, and the team's ownership group threatened to relocate the team. In September 1995, King County voters defeated a ballot measure to secure public funding for a new baseball stadium. Shortly thereafter, the Mariners' first appearance in the MLB postseason and their victory in the 1995 American League Division Series (ALDS) revived public desire to keep the team in Seattle. As a result, the Washington State Legislature approved an alternate means of funding for the stadium with public money. The site, just south of the Kingdome, was selected in September 1996 and construction began in March 1997. The bonds issued to finance Safeco Field were retired on October 1, 2011, five years earlier than anticipated.

T-Mobile Park is also used for amateur baseball events, including the Washington Interscholastic Activities Association high school state championships and one Washington Huskies game per season. Major non-baseball events that have been held at T-Mobile Park include the 2001 Seattle Bowl and WrestleMania XIX in 2003, which attracted the stadium's record attendance of 54,097.

The stadium was originally named Safeco Field under a 20-year naming-rights deal with Seattle-based Safeco Insurance. T-Mobile acquired the naming rights on December 19, 2018, and the name change took effect on January 1, 2019.

Location and transportation
T-Mobile Park is in the SoDo district of downtown Seattle, bounded by Dave Niehaus Way (a block of 1st Avenue S.) to the west, Edgar Martínez Drive (formerly S. Atlantic Street) to the south, Royal Brougham Way to the north, and BNSF railroad tracks to the east. The stadium is near the western terminus of Interstate 90, the nation's longest interstate.

Parking is available at the stadium's parking garage across Edgar Martínez Drive, the Lumen Field garage to the North, and other privately operated lots in the area. Sounder commuter rail services nearby King Street Station. T-Mobile Park is also served by the 1 Line of Sound Transit's Link light rail system and local King County Metro and Sound Transit Express bus routes via the nearby Stadium Station.

History
On March 30, 1994, county executive Gary Locke appointed a task force to assess the need for a new baseball stadium to replace the rapidly deteriorating Kingdome. Many feared that the Mariners would leave Seattle if a new stadium was not built. In January 1995, the 28-member task force recommended to the King County Council that the public should be involved in financing the stadium. The task force concluded that a sales tax increase of 0.1% (to 8.3%) would be sufficient to fund the stadium. King County held a special election on September 19, asking the public for this sales tax increase; the measure led early, but was narrowly defeated by one-fifth of one percent.

On October 14, a special session of the state legislature authorized a different funding package for a new stadium that included a food and beverage tax in King County restaurants and bars, car rental surcharge in King County, a ballpark admissions tax, a credit against the state sales tax, and sale of a special stadium license plate. Nine days later, the King County Council approved the funding package, and established the Washington State Major League Baseball Stadium Public Facilities District to own the ballpark and oversee design and construction. Taxpayer suits opposing the legislative actions and the taxes failed in the courts.

On September 9, 1996, the site was selected for the new stadium, just south of the Kingdome. In late fall, several members of the King County Council wrote a letter to the Seattle Mariners, requesting a postponement of the projected $384.5-million stadium project. In response, Mariners ownership held a news conference stating that they would either sell the team or move it from Seattle. After public outcry, the King County Council voted to reaffirm its cooperation with the Mariners in building a new stadium. Team ownership contributed $145 million to cover cost overruns.

Construction officially began in 1997, with a groundbreaking ceremony on March 8 featuring Mariners star Ken Griffey Jr. The construction, overseen by chief financial officer (and former team president and minority owner) Kevin Mather, continued through the beginning of the 1999 season. Its first game was on Thursday, July 15, immediately after the All-Star break; the Mariners lost 3–2 to the San Diego Padres with 44,607 in attendance.

The naming rights were sold in June 1998 to Seattle-based Safeco Insurance, which paid $40 million for a 20-year deal. The 2018 season was the last played under this name, and the Safeco signage was removed from the ballpark beginning that November. The naming rights were awarded to T-Mobile on December 19, which paid $87.5 million for an agreement that will last 25 years, and the name change officially took effect on January 1, 2019.

Ken Griffey Jr. returned to Safeco Field in 2007 with the Cincinnati Reds (where he had been traded after the 1999 season) to a hero's welcome. In commemoration of Griffey's achievements with the team, the Mariners unveiled a new poster that declared Safeco Field "The House That Griffey Built."

The Mariners moved the fences at Safeco Field closer to home plate before the 2013 season "to create an environment that is fair for both hitters and pitchers," according to General Manager Jack Zduriencik. Safeco Field had been considered one of the most pitcher-friendly ballparks in the majors since it opened. The center field scoreboard and ad panels were replaced with an  board during renovations, becoming the largest among all stadium scoreboards in the major leagues at the time.

After the 2017 season, the field surface, in place since the stadium opened in 1999, underwent its first full replacement. The infield and foul territory were redone in 2012, but the outfield had not been replaced before the resodding.

Features

Like most ballparks built from the 1990s onward, T-Mobile Park is a "retro-modern" style ballpark that incorporates many of the features of ballparks built in the 1950s and earlier with modern amenities. In contrast with the Kingdome and other multi-purpose stadiums built primarily during the 1960s and 1970s, T-Mobile Park features a brick façade, an asymmetrical field dimension, a natural grass field, and spectator sightlines more suited for baseball, and is surrounded by city streets, a railroad line, and buildings. Modern features include a retractable roof, luxury suites, extensive food and beverage selection beyond traditional ballpark fare, and full ADA accessibility. There previously was technology that allowed spectators to monitor special game-time features with Nintendo DS receivers.

Layout
The park has four main gates open to all ticketholders during Mariners games, at the southwest, northwest, northeast, and southeast corners. These are identified as Home Plate, Left Field, Center Field, and Right Field, respectively. Entry to all ticketholders is also available through the Mariners Team Store off 1st Avenue and at "The 'Pen" entry behind the bullpens in left field. Special entrances for media and holders of certain ticket levels are on the southwest and south sides of the stadium.

There are five main levels to the stadium: Field (or Street), Main Concourse (100 level – 20,634 seats), Club Level (200 level – 4,585 seats), Suite Level (1,945 seats), and Upper Concourse (300 level – 15,955 seats). Two bleacher sections are above left field and below the center field scoreboard, with 3,706 seats. The Broadcast Center (press box) is on the Club Level and sub-level between it and the Main Level. As the field is approximately at street level, entry into any of the main gates requires visitors to ascend a flight of stairs, escalator, or elevator to access the main concourse, with the exception of the Right Field Entry, which opens onto the main concourse. Stairs, escalators, elevators, and ramps around the park provide access to all levels.

Seating capacity

Attendance record
 54,097 – WWE WrestleMania XIX

Food service
T-Mobile Park has an extensive food and beverage selection above and beyond the traditional ballpark fare of hot dog, pizza, soda, and beer. Concession stands selling traditional ballpark fare are plentiful on the main and upper concourses. Food courts behind home plate on the main concourse, as well as in "The 'Pen" (known as the Bullpen Market until a major 2011 remodel) on the street level inside the Center Field gate, sell items such as sushi, burritos, teriyaki, stir-fries, pad thai, garlic fries, crepes, health food, seafood, and barbecue. An extensive selection of beer can also be found in those locations, as well as on the upper concourse. Patrons could previously order food with a Nintendo DS app called Nintendo Fan Network.

Several restaurants and food services are available exclusively for fans purchasing certain ticket levels:
 The Diamond Club is on the field level behind home plate. Diamond Club seats are in the first eight rows behind home plate; holders of these seats are entitled to VIP parking in the facility's garage, a private entry to the ballpark on the field level, and access to the Diamond Club Lounge with buffet and bar. The lounge is decorated with Babe Ruth memorabilia. Diamond Club seats are sold on a full-season, 20-game, and single-game basis.
 70 group and individual suites occupy an entire level of the ballpark. Open only to holders of suite level tickets, each suite features a private wait staff and concierge service. Holders of suite level tickets are also entitled to private entry to the ballpark. Suite level tickets are available on a full-season, partial-season, or individual-game basis.
 The Wells Fargo Terrace Club occupies another entire level of the ballpark. Open only to holders of Terrace Club seats and certain other ticket levels, the club features two lounges and wait service to each seat. As with suite level tickets, holders of Terrace Club seats are also entitled to private entry to the ballpark. Terrace Club seats are also available on full-season, partial-season, or individual-game basis.
 The Hit it Here Café is in right field, on the same level as the Terrace Club. Open to all visitors before game time on a first-come, first-served basis (though season ticket holders may make reservations), the café is only open to holders of tickets in the café during games. Hit it Here Café tickets are only sold on an individual-game basis.

Retractable roof

T-Mobile Park has a unique retractable roof that only acts as an "umbrella" for the playing field and stands, rather than forming a complete climate-controlled enclosure, as is the case with all other retractable roofs in Major League Baseball. The park rarely needs to be heated or cooled due to Seattle's mild climate, but frequent precipitation necessitated a roof. The roof is sometimes closed on particularly cold nights, which helps prevent radiation heat loss. The only other covered baseball stadium in the world with permanent openings is the fixed-roof Seibu Dome in Tokorozawa, Saitama, Japan, home of the Saitama Seibu Lions.

In the open position, the roof rests over the BNSF Railway tracks that bound the stadium to the east, with part of it hanging over the stands in right field. This has the effect of echoing the whistles from passing trains into the stadium. Train horns were often heard inside the stadium throughout the 2000s, but abated significantly when an overpass was built for Royal Brougham Way, the street that bounds the stadium to the north which previously crossed the tracks.

The roof consists of three major sections that extend into the closed position in a telescoping manner, with the two outer sections resting under the larger center section. Each section rests on a set of parallel tracks on the north and south sides of the stadium, with the outer sections moving along the inner set of tracks, and the center section moving along the outer set. Each section is structurally independent; i.e., no section depends on another for structural stability. "Welcome to T-Mobile Park, Seattle" is painted on top of the center section, visible from aircraft whether the roof is open or closed. A lighted "Safeco Field" sign was added to the east side of the roof in 2007, which aided in identification of the stadium from the freeways to the east; this sign has since been replaced with the T-Mobile Park name in its signature magenta color.

Each section is independently powered by electric motors that move the respective sections along the tracks. It is controlled from a central control room under the center field scoreboard. Depending on wind and weather conditions, the roof takes approximately ten minutes to move from the fully open to the fully closed position, and vice versa. The roof movement is nearly silent, blending in with the ambient noise typically present during a game. During normal operation, the movement of each section is governed by computers, with all three sections moving at the same time. During an emergency or maintenance operation, each section can be independently moved. A working spare motor and wheel assembly for the roof can be found inside the center field gate. In its present state, it serves to educate visitors on how the roof operates, but if needed, it can be used to replace a similar part on the roof should one become damaged or defective.

On April 7, 2013, Total Pro Sports voted Safeco Field the 8th Best Place to Catch a Game in 2013, mainly owing to the design of the retractable roof.

Ground rules concerning the roof
Batted ball striking the roof or roof trusses:
 A ball striking the roof or roof truss in fair territory is judged fair or foul in relation to where it lands.
 A ball striking the roof or roof truss in foul territory is a foul ball, regardless of where it lands. (During a game on April 18, 2011, Ryan Raburn of the visiting Detroit Tigers struck one of the trusses with a foul pop-up; Raburn is the only batter to date to hit any part of the roof in this manner.)
 A ball striking the roof or roof truss is still considered in flight, and the batter is out if legally caught by a fielder, regardless of where it struck.

Movement of the roof:
 If the game starts with the roof open, it may be closed during the game if weather conditions warrant, and at the discretion of the home team. Play may continue during closure, unless the umpires determine it is necessary to stop play.
 If the game starts with the roof closed, it may be opened during the game if weather conditions warrant. Opening the roof can only start between innings, after notification of the umpire crew chief. The visiting team may challenge the decision to open the roof, but final decision over whether to open the roof lies with the crew chief. The roof may only be opened once during a game.

Scoreboards
T-Mobile Park features a manual scoreboard, the second-largest HD video display scoreboard in MLB, a color LED out-of-town scoreboard, and LED ribbon boards along the terraces. The board can be used either all at once, such as for live action or video replays, or split into sections for displaying information such as statistics and advertisements.

Additionally, television screens showing the local telecast of the game hang from the bottom of the Terrace Club level, for spectators seated in the last several rows of the main concourse seating areas, as well as those standing on the main concourse. Though fans in these areas have a full view of the field, their view of the scoreboards is obstructed by the overhang of the Terrace Club level. These screens display the content shown on the video board between innings or when the telecast is on a commercial break.

Baseball Museum of the Pacific Northwest
Additionally, it features hands-on displays explaining the composition of baseballs and bats, and the different types of gloves, as well as a replica outfield fence with props to allow fans to photograph themselves pretending to be outfielders.

Mariners Hall of Fame

Co-located with the Baseball Museum of the Pacific Northwest, the Mariners Hall of Fame features bronze plaques of the nine inducted members: Alvin Davis (1997), Broadcaster Dave Niehaus (2000), Jay Buhner (2004), Edgar Martínez (2007), Randy Johnson (2012), Dan Wilson (2012), Ken Griffey Jr. (2013), Lou Pinella (2014), Jamie Moyer (2015), and Ichiro Suzuki (2022). The plaques describe their contributions to the franchise, as well as murals and television screens showing highlights of their careers with the Mariners.

Other features
The flagship Mariners Team Store is on the west side of the stadium. The first level of the store, on the street level, sells a comprehensive assortment of Mariners merchandise, while the upper level, on the main concourse, displays game-used items for sale, as well as a custom jersey embroidery station. Other stores include the Kids' Clubhouse at the northeast corner on the main concourse, a walk-in store at the southwest corner on the upper concourse, a store near the bridge from the parking garage on the club level, and kiosks throughout the ballpark.

Children's Hospital Playfield is a playground for children at the northeast corner of the stadium on the main concourse. Also in this area is "Moose's Munchies", a concession stand selling ballpark fare in child-sized portions.

The Moose Den, on the main concourse near the Children's Hospital Playfield, is a meet-and-greet area for the Mariner Moose, the team's mascot.

Tours
T-Mobile Park also gives walking tours of the stadium for $15 as of September 2021. Departing from the main Team Store, the tour includes information about the stadium not generally provided at games, as well as entry into areas not open to the general public during games, including the visitors' clubhouse, playing field and dugouts, Dave Niehaus Broadcast Center (press box), and a luxury suite.

Artwork

T-Mobile Park and its adjoining parking garage feature extensive public art displays, including:

 "The Tempset", a chandelier made of 1,000 resin baseball bats above the home plate entry. A companion 27-foot diameter compass rose mosaic at the home plate rotunda captures a number of elements in the history of baseball. It was created by Linda Beaumont, Stuart Keeler, and Michael Machnic.
 "Quilts" depicting each MLB team logo, made from recycled metal including license plates from the respective teams' states (or the province of Ontario in the case of the Toronto Blue Jays, or the District of Columbia in the case of the Washington Nationals). The collection also includes references to the history of baseball in the Pacific Northwest.
 Stainless steel cutouts of players in various poses while catching, batting, fielding, and pitching, integrated into the fences at the stadium's four main gates.
 Six Pitches, a series of metal sculptures depicting hands gripping baseballs for various types of pitches along the west facade of the garage.
 A  bronze baseball glove,  by Gerard Tsutakawa, that has become an icon for T-Mobile Park.
 The Defining Moment, a mural by Thom Ross depicting Edgar Martínez's famed "The Double".
 Children's Hospital Wishing Well, which features a bronze statue of a child in batting position, and includes a geyser effect that was used at the end of the national anthem.
 Porcelain enamel on steel flag-mounted banner-panels depicting "Positions of the Field".

Statues
A bronze statue of Mariners broadcaster Dave Niehaus (1935–2010) was unveiled on September 16, 2011. The statue captures the broadcaster honored by the Baseball Hall of Fame with the Ford C. Frick Award in 2008, and who broadcast 5,284 Mariners games over 34 seasons (1977–2010), at a desk, behind a microphone, wearing headphones with his Mariners scorebook in front of him. His scorebook is opened to the box score for Game 5 of the 1995 American League Division Series, when Edgar Martínez hit "The Double". There is an empty seat next to the statue, so fans can sit next to Niehaus and pose for photos. His longtime broadcast partner Rick Rizzs presided over a private ceremony to unveil the statue. The Dave Niehaus Broadcast Center is on the Club Level behind home plate. When Niehaus died, his headset and microphone were placed by his empty seat in the Broadcast Center as a tribute.

In April 2017, a statue of Ken Griffey Jr. by sculptor Lou Cella was unveiled outside the Home Plate Entrance to the ballpark. After the 2017 season, the bat was broken off in an attempt to steal it, but a bystander from the office building across the street ran down the perpetrator and recovered the bat, which was subsequently reattached.

A bronze statue of Martínez, also made by Cella, was installed in August 2021 on the south side of the stadium near Griffey's statue.

Notable events at T-Mobile Park

Major League

In 2000, the Mariners defeated the Chicago White Sox in the ALDS 3–0, but were defeated by the New York Yankees in the ALCS, 4–2. The next year, the Mariners defeated the Cleveland Indians 3–2 in the ALDS, but were again defeated by the Yankees in the ALCS, 4–1; it was not until 21 years later in 2022 that another playoff game would be played, the 3rd and deciding game of the ALDS, which ended in 18 innings with the Houston Astros emerging victorious 1-0. The World Series has never been played at the park.
 The ballpark also hosted the 2001 MLB All-Star Game. The American League defeated the National League, 4–1. Cal Ripken Jr. of the AL's Baltimore Orioles was the game's MVP. A bronze plaque in the visitor's bullpen now marks the location where Ripken hit the final All-Star Game home run of his Hall of Fame career.
 On October 1, Ichiro Suzuki collected his 258th hit of the season in a home game, breaking the 84-year-old single season hit record of 257 previously held by George Sisler. Sisler, who died in 1973 (the year Suzuki was born), was represented at the game by his daughter and four other family members. Suzuki finished the season with 262 hits.
 On April 15, Ken Griffey Jr. became the first (and only) player in franchise history to hit 400 home runs. He homered in the 5th inning off the Angels' Jered Weaver, en route to an 11–3 triumph.
 The Mariners'  interleague series with the Florida Marlins was played in Seattle due to a scheduling conflict with rock band U2's 360° Tour at Sun Life Stadium. With the Marlins officially designated as the home team, the designated hitter rule was not in effect, marking the first time that a game was played under such rules at an American League stadium in modern interleague play. Félix Hernández became the first pitcher to record a hit at the ballpark.
 On April 21, Philip Humber of the Chicago White Sox threw a perfect game against the Mariners, marking the 21st time a perfect game had been thrown. This also marks the first perfect game and no-hitter at the ballpark.
 On June 8, 2012, six Mariners pitchers (Kevin Millwood, Charlie Furbush, Stephen Pryor, Lucas Luetge, Brandon League, Tom Wilhelmsen) threw a combined no-hitter against the Los Angeles Dodgers, marking the third no-hitter thrown by the Mariners, and the first one accomplished by the Mariners at the ballpark.
 On August 15, 2012, Mariners pitcher Félix Hernández pitched the 23rd perfect game in Major League Baseball history and the first perfect game in Mariners history. This marked the second perfect game and third no-hitter at the park, all of which occurred in the 2012 season. This was also the first time in Major League Baseball history that two perfect games occurred at the same park in the same season.
 On August 10, Ken Griffey Jr. became the seventh member inducted into the Mariners' Hall of Fame, joining a group that includes Alvin Davis (1997), Dave Niehaus (2000), Jay Buhner (2004), Edgar Martínez (2007), Randy Johnson (2012) and Dan Wilson (2012).
 On August 12, Hisashi Iwakuma threw the team's fifth no-hitter in team history against the Baltimore Orioles; Iwakuma became the second Japanese-born pitcher to throw a no-hitter (after Hideo Nomo in 2001); it was the fourth no-hitter in the ballpark's history.
 On May 4, Los Angeles Angels slugger Albert Pujols recorded his 3,000th major league hit. Pujols is the 32nd player in MLB history to achieve such a feat. He is also the fourth player in MLB history to record 3,000 hits and 600 home runs, joining Hank Aaron, Willie Mays and Alex Rodriguez.
 On May 5, Baltimore Orioles pitcher John Means threw a no-hitter against the Mariners, striking out 12 batters while facing the minimum of 27 batters. It was the fifth no-hitter in the ballpark's history.
 On May 18, 2021, Detroit Tigers pitcher Spencer Turnbull threw a no-hitter against the Mariners, recording nine strikeouts and two walks in a 5–0 win. It was the eighth no-hitter in Tigers history and the first no-hitter by a Tiger since Justin Verlander's in 2011. It was the second no-hitter at T-Mobile Park in 2021 and the sixth no-hitter in the park's history. It was also the fifth no-hitter in the 2021 MLB season.
 On September 30, 2022, Mariners catcher Cal Raleigh hit a walk-off home run against the Athletics to send the Mariners to the postseason for the first time since 2001. At the time of Raleigh's walk-off home run, the Mariners had the longest postseason drought in any of the Big 4 North American sports leagues, which made this moment even more special.

College baseball
On May 4, 2007, an NCAA Pacific-10 Conference baseball attendance record was set when the Washington Huskies hosted defending National Champion Oregon State in front of 10,421 spectators. Washington won the game, 6–2.

College football
Then-Safeco Field was the venue for the first edition of the short-lived Seattle Bowl college football game.

Soccer
The stadium hosted several soccer matches before the opening of Lumen Field, which was designed for soccer. To prepare for soccer matches, the field has to be sodded to cover and replace the dirt infield.

On March 2, 2002, the United States men's national soccer team played Honduras in a friendly match, winning 4–0 in front of a then-record crowd of 38,534.

The stadium hosted four matches during the 2002 CONCACAF Women's Gold Cup in November, including two matches featuring the United States women's national soccer team, as part of qualification for the 2003 FIFA Women's World Cup. The first U.S. match, against Panama, had an attendance of 21,522; the second match, against Costa Rica, was attended by 10,079 fans.

Wrestling
On March 30, 2003, the stadium hosted WrestleMania XIX, which set an all-time record attendance for the facility of 54,097.

Concerts

Other
 The stadium was the home to the Microsoft annual employee meeting until 2012, attracting over 20,000 employees.
Bernie Sanders held a rally for his 2016 presidential campaign on March 25.
 The stadium hosted Nitro Circus Live on September 16, 2017.
 On September 15, 2018, Russell M. Nelson, President of the Church of Jesus Christ of Latter-day Saints, along with his wife, Wendy Watson Nelson, and Second Counselor Henry B. Eyring, held a devotional that was attended by 49,089 church members, friends, and members of the community.
In late spring, numerous local high schools hold graduation ceremonies at the venue (while the Mariners are away).
The NHL announced that the 2024 NHL Winter Classic will be held at T-Mobile Park, featuring the Seattle Kraken and the Vegas Golden Knights.

See also

 Rick "The Peanut Man" Kaminski

References

External links

 Stadium site on MLB.com
 Video of Safeco Field – shows the roof open and close in time lapse
 Safeco Field Seating Chart
 ESPN Review

T-Mobile US branded venue
Deutsche Telekom
Sports venues in Seattle
Seattle Mariners stadiums
Major League Baseball venues
Retractable-roof stadiums in the United States
Baseball venues in Seattle
Defunct NCAA bowl game venues
Sports venues completed in 1999
NBBJ buildings
SoDo, Seattle
Washington Huskies baseball venues
1999 establishments in Washington (state)